Stigmella childi is a species of moth in the family Nepticulidae. It is endemic to New Zealand.

The length of the forewings are about 2 mm.

The larvae feed on Celmisia haastii. They mine the leaves of their host plant.

References

External links
Fauna of New Zealand - Number 16: Nepticulidae (Insecta: Lepidoptera)

Nepticulidae
Moths of New Zealand
Endemic fauna of New Zealand
Moths described in 1989
Endemic moths of New Zealand